George Duncan Henderson (1911-1985) was a New Zealand cartoonist. He signed his work 'Hen'. His work was published in the Christchurch Star, Timaru Herald, and Taranaki Daily News.

References

External links 
 Search for work by George Henderson on DigitalNZ

New Zealand cartoonists
1911 births
1985 deaths